Jean-François Pierre Peyron, full name of Pierre Peyron (15 December 1744 – 20 January 1814), was a French Neoclassical painter.

Biography
Peyron was born in Aix-en-Provence, where he studied art under Claude Arnulphy. He was later a pupil of Louis-Jean-François Lagrenée and was regarded as among the best painters of his generation.

He was one of the first to re-apply the Classic principles of composition, in the manner of Poussin, while the prevailing fashion was in favour of Rococo.

He won the prestigious Prix de Rome in 1773, ahead of David who was also a candidate. He spent the years between 1775 and 1782 in Rome, with the Academy of France in Rome.

On his return to Paris, Peyron found that the career of David had taken its rise and had completely eclipsed his own, relegating it to a minor role in the history of art – which became evident in the exhibitions at the Salon of Paris between 1785 and 1787. David did, however, pay homage to Peyron at the time of his funeral, stating: "He had opened my eyes".  Peyron died in Paris, aged 69.

List of works (partial) 

 The Death of Seneca (1773) - a lost painting, which won Peyron the Prix de Rome
 The outcast Belisarius receiving hospitality from a peasant (1779), Musée de Augustins, Toulouse
 The Funeral of Miltiades (1782), The Louvre, Paris
 The Resurrection of Christ (1784), Church of Saint-Louis-en-l'Île, Paris
 The Death of Alceste (1785), The Louvre, Paris
 The Death of Socrates (1787), Statens Museum for Kunst, Copenhagen
 King Perseus of Macedon in front of Aemilius Paulus

Notes

References
 Pierre Rosenberg and Udolpho Van De Sandt,  Pierre Peyron, 1744-1814 , 1983, éd. Arthéna

External links

 Insecula on Jean-François-Pierre Peyron
 Web Gallery of Art - Pictures
 Web Gallery of Art - Biography

1744 births
1814 deaths
People from Aix-en-Provence
French neoclassical painters
Prix de Rome for painting
18th-century French painters
French male painters
19th-century French painters
19th-century French male artists
18th-century French male artists